The Copa Eva Duarte was a Spanish football tournament organized by the Royal Spanish Football Federation (RFEF) and contested by the winners of La Liga and the Copa del Generalísimo.

History
In September 1940, a match with this format had the name of Copa de Campeones. It was not repeated until December 1945 when, due to the good relations with the Spanish military government the ambassador of Argentina, offered a trophy called Copa de Oro Argentina. Both these trophies were unofficial and were only played once.

In 1941 the Copa Presidente FEF was established as an official tournament founded and organized by the RFEF; however, it was also only contested once, and though 11 of the 12 matches in its mini-league format were played between April and May 1941, its last, decisive fixture was delayed until eventually taking place in September 1947.

Also in 1947, the "Copa Eva Duarte de Perón" was established as an annual and official tournament founded and organized by the RFEF, as a tribute to Argentine president Juan Perón and his wife Eva Perón. It was played between September and December, usually as one-match finals. The trophy was the predecessor of the current Supercopa de España, first held in 1982.

Champions by year

* The 1947 match was not actually played until June 1948.
** In 1952 and 1953 the cup was awarded to FC Barcelona, as they had won the La Liga/Copa del Rey double.

Titles by team

Top goalscorers

Source:

References

Defunct football cup competitions in Spain
1947–48 in Spanish football cups
1948–49 in Spanish football cups
1949–50 in Spanish football cups
1950–51 in Spanish football cups
1951–52 in Spanish football cups
1952–53 in Spanish football cups
Spain
History of football in Spain
Recurring sporting events established in 1947
Recurring sporting events disestablished in 1953